France competed at the 1994 Winter Paralympics in Lillehammer, Norway. 26 competitors from France won 31 medals including 14 gold, 6 silver and 11 bronze, and finished 4th in the medal table.

See also 
 France at the Paralympics
 France at the 1994 Winter Olympics

References 

France at the Paralympics
1994 in French sport
Nations at the 1994 Winter Paralympics